The Watson Report was a Canadian current affairs television series, seen nationally on CBC from 1975 to 1981. The titular host was Patrick Watson, previously of This Hour Has Seven Days whose interviews for the show included national political leaders. More elaborate filmed features appeared in The Watson Report during its later years.

External links
 Queen's University Directory of CBC Television Series (The Watson Report archived listing link via archive.org)

1975 Canadian television series debuts
1981 Canadian television series endings
CBC Television original programming
1970s Canadian television news shows
1980s Canadian television news shows